The men's 100 metres at the 2012 African Championships in Athletics was held at the Stade Charles de Gaulle on 27 and 28 June.

Medalists

Records

Schedule

Results

Round 1
First 2 in each heat (Q) and 8 best performers (q) advance to the Semifinals.

Wind:Heat 1: -0.7 m/s, Heat 2: -2.1 m/s, Heat 3: -4.7 m/s, Heat 4: -2.6 m/s, Heat 5: -2.9 m/s, Heat 6: -1.6 m/s, Heat 7 -2.0 m/s, Heat 8: -1.4 m/s

Semifinals
First 2 in each heat (Q) and 2 best performers (q) advance to the Final.

Wind:Heat 1: -0.8 m/s, Heat 2: -1.0 m/s, Heat 3: -0.2 m/s

Final
Wind: -0.9 m/s

References

Results

100 Men
100 metres at the African Championships in Athletics